The Pagan Madonna is a 1981 Hungarian crime action comedy film directed by Gyula Mészáros.

Cast 
 István Bujtor - Csöpi Ötvös
 András Kern - Dr. Tibor Kardos
 Péter Benkő - Szemere nyomozó
 Ferenc Zenthe - Záray százados
 László Bánhidi - Matuska
 Mária Gór Nagy - Zsuzsa
 Ferenc Kállai - István Csík
 Gabi Pálok - Bence, Matuska's grandson
 István Kovács - Gábor Soltész

References

External links 

1980s crime action films
Films set in Lake Balaton
Hungarian crime films